Sahlen Packing Company Inc. or Sahlen's, is an American meat packing company headquartered in Buffalo, New York. The company was founded by Joseph Sahlen in 1869. Sahlen's specializes in smokehouse deli meats (ham, turkey, chicken, hot ham) as well as hot dogs and sausages.  Sahlen's products can now be found in over 30 states across the US.

Sponsorships

Racing team
Sahlen's is currently the corporate sponsor of the Sahlen's Six Hours of Watkins Glen as well as Team Sahlen. The team features Sahlen's owner Joe Sahlen and Joe, Wayne, and Will Nonnamaker.

Professional soccer
Sahlen's sponsored the Western New York Flash professional women's soccer team. The Sahlen family owned and operated the franchise from 2008 to 2016.

Official hot dog title
Sahlen's is the official hot dog of the Charlotte Knights, Watkins Glen International, and the Buffalo Bisons.

Sporting facilities
On October 9, 2018, Sahlen's bought the naming rights to Sahlen Field, a baseball park located in downtown Buffalo, New York, which hosts the Buffalo Bisons minor league baseball team.

On February 10, 2011, Sahlen's bought the five-year naming rights to Sahlen's Stadium a soccer-specific stadium in Rochester, New York. In October 2015, the stadium operators announced that they would not exercise the option to continue the existing naming agreement with Sahlen's, but would instead seek a new agreement. In the interim, the stadium reverted to being known as Rochester Rhinos Stadium.

Sahlen's also owns Sahlen's Sports Park, a 180,000-square-foot multi-sport public indoor facility with three open fields, one boarded field, a fitness center and cafe located in Elma, New York.

References

External links

Brand name hot dogs
Brand name meats
Companies established in 1869
Manufacturing companies based in Buffalo, New York
Sausage companies of the United States
1869 establishments in New York (state)
Food and drink companies based in New York (state)